The Mamfe or Nyang languages are three languages that form a branch of Southern Bantoid languages spoken in southwest Cameroon. They are:
Denya, Kendem and Kenyang (Nyang). 
They are clearly related to each other, though they are not close.

References

 
Southern Bantoid languages